Pajūris is a small town in Šilalė district municipality, Tauragė County, in western Lithuania. According to the 2011 census, the town has a population of 784 people.

Gallery

References

Towns in Lithuania
Towns in Tauragė County